Year of the Pig is a Big Finish Productions audio drama based on the long-running British science fiction television series Doctor Who.

Plot
The Sixth Doctor and Peri, vacationing at the Hotel Palace Thermae in 1913 Ostend, encounter several mysterious guests: the eccentric Miss Alice Bultitude, the colourful Inspector Alphonse Chardalot and, last but not least, Toby the Sapient Pig.  What is Toby's secret?  What is the connection between the well-dressed pig and the celebrated Parisian inspector?  What does Miss Bultitude know? And are there any more of those truffles left?

Cast
The Doctor — Colin Baker
Peri — Nicola Bryant
Nurse Albertine — Adjoa Andoh
Toby the Sapient Pig — Paul Brooke
Inspector Chardalot — Michael Keating
Miss Alice Bultitude — Maureen O'Brien

Notes

Maureen O'Brien played the First Doctor's companion Vicki on Doctor Who on television.  Year of the Pig marks her first acting return to Doctor Who since she left the programme in 1965.
Adjoa Andoh played Sister Jatt, one of the Sisters of Plenitude in the 2006 Doctor Who episode "New Earth".  She later played Francine Jones, mother of the Tenth Doctor's companion Martha Jones, in the 2007 and 2008 series.
Michael Keating is best known for his role as Vila Restal in the BBC science-fiction series Blake's 7.  He also appeared in the Fourth Doctor serial The Sun Makers.
A theatrical performer known as Toby the Sapient Pig did in fact exhibit himself in the nineteenth century, and even published an "autobiography".  However, he was long dead before the setting of this story.
Marcel Proust appears in a non-speaking role in this story.  The play contains many references to his work À la recherche du temps perdu.

External links
Big Finish Productions – Year of the Pig

2006 audio plays
Sixth Doctor audio plays
Fiction set in 1913